Barry Nelson (born Robert Haakon Nielsen; April 16, 1917 – April 7, 2007) was an American actor, noted as the first actor to portray Ian Fleming's secret agent James Bond.

Early life
Nelson was born in San Francisco, the son of Norwegian immigrants, Betsy (née Christophersen) and Trygve Nielsen. His year of birth has been subject to some debate, but is listed as 1917 on both his 1943 Army enlistment record and his 1993 voter registration records.

Career
With MGM, Nelson made his screen debut in the role as Paul Clark in Shadow of the Thin Man (1941) starring William Powell and Myrna Loy, with Donna Reed. He followed that with his role as Lew Rankin in the film noir Johnny Eager (1942) starring Robert Taylor and Lana Turner.

During his service in the United States Army Air Forces during World War II, Nelson debuted on the Broadway stage in Moss Hart's play Winged Victory (1943) in the role of Bobby Grills. His next Broadway appearance was as Peter Sloan, playwright, in Hart's Light Up the Sky (1948). He appeared on Broadway with Barbara Bel Geddes in the original Broadway production of The Moon Is Blue. During the play's run, he also starred in a CBS half-hour drama called The Hunter, premiering in July 1952. He played Bart Adams, a wealthy young American whose business activities involved him in a series of adventures. He also appeared with Lauren Bacall in the Abe Burrows comedy Cactus Flower in 1965 and with Dorothy Loudon in The Fig Leaves Are Falling in 1969.  Nelson performed another Broadway role, that of Gus Hammer in The Rat Race (1949).

He was the first actor to play James Bond on screen in a 1954 adaptation of Ian Fleming's novel Casino Royale on the television anthology series Climax! (preceding Sean Connery's interpretation in Dr. No by eight years). Reportedly this was considered a pilot for a possible James Bond television series, though it is not known if Nelson intended to continue playing the character. Nelson played James Bond as an American agent whom some in the program call "Jimmy". In 2004, Nelson said, "At that time, no one had ever heard of James Bond...I was scratching my head wondering how to play it. I hadn't read the book or anything like that because it wasn't well-known." Bond did not become well known in the U.S. until President John F. Kennedy listed From Russia, with Love among his 10 favorite books in a March 17, 1961, Life article.

The program also featured Peter Lorre as Le Chiffre, the primary villain. Nelson later noted the opportunity to work with Lorre was the reason he took the role. Originally broadcast live, the production was believed lost until a kinescope emerged in the 1980s. It was released to home video and is currently available on DVD as a bonus feature with the 1967 film adaptation of the novel.

During the 1959 television series Nelson starred in 39 episodes of Hudson's Bay, playing Johnathon Banner.

Nelson appeared as Grant Decker in "Threat of Evil", a 1960 episode of The DuPont Show with June Allyson. His additional television credits include guest appearances on Alfred Hitchcock Presents, Ben Casey, The Twilight Zone (episode "Stopover in a Quiet Town"), Dr. Kildare, and in later years playing a hobo on an episode of The Ropers. He appeared regularly on television in the 1960s, having been one of the What's My Line? mystery guests and later serving as a guest panelist on that popular CBS quiz show. Nelson was also a semi-regular panelist on the daytime and nighttime versions of To Tell the Truth for three years of its run from 1962 to 1965, as well as a guest panelist a few times in 1967. Nelson appeared second most frequently on the daytime show in the three years he was a semi-regular. He hosted portions of the NBC Radio program Monitor. Nelson appeared in both the stage and screen versions of Mary, Mary.

He directed the 1968 play The Only Game in Town, as well as starring as Joe. In 1978, he was nominated for a Tony Award for Best Actor in a Musical for his role as Dan Connors in the Broadway musical The Act (1977) with Liza Minnelli. His final appearance on Broadway was as Julian Marsh in 42nd Street (1986).

"He was a very naturalistic, believable actor," said his agent, Francis Delduca. "He was good at both comedy and the serious stuff."

Personal life
Nelson was married twice – first to actress Teresa Celli, from whom he was divorced in 1951 (according to his New York Times obituary), and later to Nansilee ("Nansi") Hoy, to whom he was married until his death.

Nelson and his second wife divided their time between homes in New York and France.

Nelson died on April 7, 2007, while traveling in Bucks County, Pennsylvania, nine days before his 90th birthday.

Filmography

Film

Television
 Suspense – Episodes: "The Guy from Nowhere", "A Pocketful of Murder", "The Gentleman from America", "My Old Man's Badge" (1950); "Dead Fall", "Tough Cop" (1951)
 The Hunter – Bart Adams (1952)
 My Favorite Husband – George Cooper (1953–1955)
 Climax! – James Bond – Episode: "Casino Royale" (1954); Dick Milton – Episode: "The Push-Button Giant" (1958) 
 Hudson's Bay – Jonathan Banner (1959)
 The Twilight Zone – Bob Frazier – Episode: "Stopover in a Quiet Town" (1964)
 The Alfred Hitchcock Hour – Dr. James Parkerson – Episode: "Anyone for Murder?" (1964)
 Thriller – Hugo Fane – Episode: "Ring Once for Death" (1974)
 The Ropers – Uncle Bill – Episode: "The Skeleton" (1979)
 Taxi – Dr. Jeffries – Episode: "Mr. Personalities" (1981)
 Murder, She Wrote – Eugene McClenden – Episode: "Mourning Among the Wisterias" (1989)

References

External links
 
 
 
 Barry Nelson obituary at MI6.co.uk

1917 births
2007 deaths
American male film actors
American male stage actors
American male television actors
20th-century American male actors
American people of Norwegian descent
Male actors from San Francisco
University of California, Berkeley alumni
Metro-Goldwyn-Mayer contract players
Male actors from the San Francisco Bay Area
United States Army personnel of World War II